The 2016–17 season was Wigan Athletic's 85th year in existence and their first back in the Championship, after gaining promotion the previous season. Along with competing in the Championship, the club also participated in the FA Cup and League Cup. The season covered the period from 1 July 2016 to 30 June 2017.

First team squad
As of 5 June 2016

Transfers

In

Out

Loans in

Loans out

Squad statistics

Appearances

Top scorers

Competitions

Pre-season friendlies

Season Summary

Championship

League table

Result by round

Matches

FA Cup

EFL Cup

References

Wigan Athletic
Wigan Athletic F.C. seasons